Joseph Krawzyck is a French rugby league player who represented France in the 1954 World Cup.

Biography
Krawzyck, then playing for Lyon Villeurbanne XIII, was called up to represent France at the first edition of the Rugby League World Cup played in France. He took part at all of the tournament matches, scoring a try during the pool stage match against Great Britain, which ended 13-0. He took part as well at the final, which was also played against the same opposition team at the Parc des Princes in Paris in front of 30.368 spectators, but could not prevent the British national side from winning their first World Cup title.

References

Possibly living people
French rugby league players
French people of Polish descent
France national rugby league team players
Lyon Villeurbanne XIII players
RC Roanne XIII players
Rugby league props
Year of birth missing
Place of birth missing